1948 in Korea may refer to:
1948 in North Korea
1948 in South Korea